Hrvatski Top Model is a Croatian reality television series based on Tyra Banks' America's Next Top Model and is aired on RTL. The show pits contestants against each other in a variety of competitions to determine who will win the title of the new Croatian "Top Model", as well as a modelling contract with an agency in hopes of a promising career start in the modeling industry.

Croatian top model Tatjana Jurić fills the host role which Tyra Banks performed in the original series. She is the head of the search as well as a mentor for the 16 girls who have been chosen to live in a house together in Zagreb. Jurić and the panel of judges, which includes Borut Mihalić, Boris Bašić, Damir Hoyka and Boris Cavlina Jurić, judge the girls each week. Usually one, but often two girls are eliminated until only three girls are left.

Croatian fashion designer Marco Grubnic had several appearances on the first season to introduce the girls to the fashion industry and give them constructive criticism.

After 14 weeks, Sabina Behlić was named the winner of the first season, beating Valentina Dropulić and Marina Jerković in the final.

The show was scheduled to return with a second season in autumn 2010, with Vanja Rupena replacing Jurić.

Differences between ANTM and Hrvatski Top Model
In its appearance, tasks, editing and elimination process, Hrvatski Top Model is much more similar to Germany's Next Topmodel rather than ANTM. This version  has a runway walk in front of the judges, each contestant faces her verdict individually without any particular order, and its contestants travel to more than one international destination in one season. Also, a pre-recorded final show held in a TV studio where the ranking order between the final three contestants is decided, and every finalist is involved in a final runway.

Cycles

References

External links
 Constantin Entertainment Production website

Croatia
Croatian reality television series
2008 Croatian television series debuts
2010 Croatian television series endings
Non-American television series based on American television series
RTL (Croatian TV channel) original programming